Clark Material Handling Company (CMHC), stylized as CLARK, is an American manufacturer of forklift trucks based in Lexington, Kentucky. The company has a production plant in Changwon, South Korea. Clark currently (2018) offers some 304 different models. 

According to the company, there are some 350,000 Clark forklift trucks currently in operation around the world. Clark is credited with having invented the world's first truck with a hydraulic lifting mechanism in 1920, the Truclift, the forerunner to modern forklift trucks.

The company started as a manufacturer of transmissions and axles for the automobile industry. Since 2003, Clark has been owned by the Young An Hat Company of Korea.

History 
Clark Material Handling Company began as a division of Clark Equipment Company in 1919.

In 1953, the factory in Mülheim an der Ruhr was opened.

In 1997, Clark built its 1,000,000 (millionth) forklift.

In 2017, Clark celebrated its 100th year in business.

Factories
The Clark company has factories in South Korea, China, Vietnam, and Lexington, Kentucky.

See also
 Forklift truck
 Cortez Motor Home

References

External links

 The company website
 Company profile - Yahoo finance
 Young An Family web site

Companies based in Lexington, Kentucky
Forklift truck manufacturers
Construction equipment manufacturers of the United States
American brands